The 2008–09 All-Ireland Junior Club Football Championship was the eighth staging of the All-Ireland Junior Club Football Championship since its establishment by the Gaelic Athletic Association.

The All-Ireland final was played on 14 February 2009 at Croke Park in Dublin, between Skellig Rangers and John Mitchels. Skellig Rangers won the match by 0-10 to 0-09 to claim their first ever championship title.

All-Ireland Junior Club Football Championship

All-Ireland final

References

2008 in Irish sport
2009 in Irish sport
All-Ireland Junior Club Football Championship
All-Ireland Junior Club Football Championship